Whitney L. Van Cleve (April 6, 1922 – January 21, 1997) was an American football coach.  He served as the head football coach at Tuskegee University from 1955 to 1963, Alabama State University from 1964 to 1968, Hampton University from 1969 to 1973, and Albany State University from 1977 to 1979, compiling career college football coaching record of 91–111–10.

Coaching career
Van Cleve began his coaching career as an assistant at Grambling State University under Eddie Robinson.

Tuskegee
Van Cleve was the ninth head football coach at Tuskegee University in Tuskegee, Alabama and he held that position for nine seasons, from 1955 until 1963.  His coaching record at Tuskegee was 41–36–5.

Alabama State
Van Cleve became the 15th head coach at Alabama State University in Montgomery, Alabama starting the 1964 season, and he remained there for the next five seasons.  He posted a record of 35–14–1.

Hampton
Van Cleve was the 13th head football coach at Hampton University in Hampton, Virginia.  Unlike his success at Alabama State, Van Cleve posted a record of 3–44–2.

Albany State
Van Cleve coached the Albany State Golden Rams football team from 1977 to 1979 and compiled a record of 12–17–2.

Head coaching record

References

1922 births
1997 deaths
Alabama State Hornets football coaches
Albany State Golden Rams football coaches
Grambling State Tigers football coaches
Hampton Pirates football coaches
Tuskegee Golden Tigers football coaches
Tuskegee Golden Tigers football players
Sportspeople from Kokomo, Indiana
Coaches of American football from Indiana
Players of American football from Indiana
African-American coaches of American football
African-American players of American football
20th-century African-American sportspeople